Ruth Hieronymi (born 8 November 1947, Bonn) is a German politician who served as a Member of the European Parliament for North Rhine-Westphalia from 1999 until 2009. She is a member of the conservative Christian Democratic Union, part of the European People's Party.

External links
 Ruth Hieronymi official website

1947 births
Living people
Christian Democratic Union of Germany MEPs
MEPs for Germany 2004–2009
MEPs for Germany 1999–2004
20th-century women MEPs for Germany
21st-century women MEPs for Germany